"Someone Like You" is a song written by Northern Irish singer and songwriter Van Morrison and recorded on his seventeenth studio album, Poetic Champions Compose (1987). It has become a wedding and movie classic and the song subsequently furnished the framework for one of Morrison's most popular classics and love ballads, "Have I Told You Lately", released in 1989.

In 1987, the single charted at number 28 on the Billboard Adult Contemporary in the U.S. In 2019, it peaked at #1 on the Ireland radio airplay chart.

Recording
"Someone Like You" was recorded in the summer of 1987 at Wool Hall Studios in Beckington, Somerset with Mick Glossop as engineer.

Other releases
This song was released again on two of Morrison's  compilation albums in 2007. A remastered version has been included in the album, Still on Top - The Greatest Hits and it is one of the songs on Van Morrison's 2007 compilation album, Van Morrison at the Movies - Soundtrack Hits.

Movies featuring "Someone Like You"
Only the Lonely (1991)
Prelude to a Kiss (1992)
French Kiss (1995)
One Fine Day (1996)
Someone Like You (2001)
Bridget Jones's Diary (2001)
American Sniper (2014)

Personnel
Van Morrison - vocals, guitar
Neil Drinkwater - piano
Steve Pearce - bass guitar
Roy Jones - drums, percussion
Fiachra Trench - string arrangement

Covers
"Someone Like You" is a popularly performed cover song, with the best-known versions by Dina Carroll, Vanessa L. Williams, Shawn Colvin and John Waite.

Notes

References

 Hage, Erik (2009). The Words and Music of Van Morrison, Praeger Publishers 
 Heylin, Clinton (2003). Can You Feel the Silence? Van Morrison: A New Biography, Chicago Review Press 

1987 singles
Van Morrison songs
Songs written by Van Morrison
Song recordings produced by Van Morrison
1987 songs
Mercury Records singles